Katwalk is a book written by Karen Kijewski and published by St. Martin's Press (owned by Macmillan Publishers with parent company Holtzbrinck Publishing Group), which later went on to win the Anthony Award for Best First Novel in 1990.

References 

Anthony Award-winning works
American mystery novels
1989 American novels